Bayrakli Mosque, also known as Yokush Mosque is a historical mosque in Samokov, Bulgaria, constructed in 1845.

History
The mosque was built by Koca Hüsrev Mehmed Pasha, who, according to the legend, ordered to erect both a cross and a crescent on the dome of the mosque. In 1966, the mosque was extensively restored. The restoration project was carried out by architect Nikola Mushanov.

Architecture
The prayer hall of the mosque is rectangular (almost square) with the size of  times . The women's prayer area is located on the balcony. The dome is built on four wooden columns. Frescoes with floral motives were painted over in the 19th century and uncovered during the restoration in 1966. There is one tall minaret next to the building.

Decoration

References

Samokov
Ottoman mosques in Bulgaria
Religious buildings and structures completed in 1845
Buildings and structures in Sofia Province
Former mosques in Bulgaria